The Snowy Valleys Council is a local government area located in the South West Slopes region of New South Wales, Australia. This area was formed in 2016 from the merger of the Tumut Shire with the neighbouring Tumbarumba Shire.

The council area comprises  and covers the western side of the southernmost portion of the Great Dividing Range and foothills in New South Wales. Large sections of the local government area are contained within national parks. At the time of its establishment, the population in the council area was estimated to be .

Mayor of Snowy Valleys Council is Councillor Ian Chaffey, who a Tumbarumba local won the most recent election

Main towns and villages

In addition to the towns of Adelong, Batlow, Tumbarumba and Tumut, localities in the area include Brindabella, Brungle, Cabramurra, Gilmore, Grahamstown, Greg Greg, Gocup, Jingellic, Khancoban, Killimicat, Little River, Maragle, Rosewood, Talbingo, Tooma, Wondalga and Yarrangobilly.

Heritage listings
The Snowy Valleys Council has a number of heritage-listed sites, including:
 Mount Kosciuszko to Eden: Bundian Way
 Tumut, Adelong Falls Gold Workings
 Tumut, Cootamundra-Tumut railway: Tumut railway station
 Tumut, 46 Russell Street: Montreal Community Theatre
 Tumut, Tumut Plains Road: Junction Bridge, Tumut

Demographics

Council
Snowy Valleys Council consists of nine Councillors elected proportionally as a single ward. All Councillors are elected for a fixed four-year term of office with effect from 9 September 2017.

See also

 Local government areas of New South Wales

References

 
2016 establishments in Australia